The Shandong University of Technology (SDUT) is a university located in Zibo, Shandong, China. The university was founded in 1956 and has a focus on engineering sciences.

History
The school was founded as the Shandong Institute of Technology in June 1956. During the Cultural Revolution, it was one of only 13 undergraduate institutions of higher learning in Shandong. It expanded into a wider institution of polytechnic learning in 1990. Finally in 2001, it merged with several other colleges into a full university under its current name.

Campus
SDUT occupies two campuses, both located in the Zhangdian District of Zibo. Together, they cover an area of approximately 2.4 million square meters, with a building area of 1.3 million square meters. The campus features 268 lecture halls with multi-media facilities and 21 laboratories.

The headquarters for the Shandong Research Institute of Engineering and Technology is also located on the SDUT campus.

Students 
There are 34,000 full-time undergraduate students and 5,300 postgraduate students enrolled at SDUT. Undergraduate students can elect to study 21 different subjects spanning nine categories: engineering, science, economics, management, literature, law, history, pedagogy, and art.

Masters' students have the choice of 14 subjects for engineering, five subjects in agricultural extension, as well as the subjects for a Master of Business Administration (MBA) and a Master of Finance (MF).

Academic Schools 

School of Transportation & Vehicle Engineering

School of Agricultural Engineering& food science

School of Electrical & Electronic Engineering

School of Computer Science & Technology

School of Chemical Engineering

School of Architectural Engineering

School of Resources & Environment Engineering

School of Materials Science & Engineering

School of Life Science

School of Science

School of Business

MBA Education Centre

School of Literature & Media Dissemination

School of Foreign Languages

School of Laws

School Of Marxism

School of Fine Arts

School of Music

School of Physical Education

Lutai textile college

School of Innovation and Entrepreneurship

Programme List 

Shandong University of Technology offers an extensive range of Bachelor's, Masters, and Doctoral Degrees for International students wishing to study in China. Undergraduate and Postgraduate courses range from studying the Arts to Mechanical Engineering, Chinese Philology to Economy. 

SDUT has 12 Doctoral Degrees that specialize in different areas of Engineering and Technology.

University Culture 

SDUT puts great stress on building its campus culture by raising students' self-consciousness, the sense of responsibility, and mission in culture building. The University has adopted measures to reach its goal of immersing the students in different levels of the campus culture, namely, the level of spiritual, institutional, and material cultures. These measures have laid a solid cultural foundation for cultivating high-quality talents and building a high-level university.

The University launched the project of campus cultural building and as a result has established the motto, the anthem, and the badge. SDUT has conducted various activities, including the “Six Major Topics” activities, students’ integrity education, the reading activity with a list recommended by 100 scholars and experts, lectures given by cultural celebrities, morality education, as well as professional ethics education for the faculty. In a sense, building the spiritual culture has become the momentum and source in enhancing the University's teaching and research level, promoting the University's features, and improving the cohesive force of the faculty.

Keeping the culture building in mind, the University continuously examines and explores institutional innovation and improvement and has amended its regulations according to the requirements of the human-oriented concept and standards of lean management. A preliminary institutional environment, which is both rigid and loose, has been established based on the human-oriented concept.

The campus infrastructure of SDUT highlights the cultural content with great efforts on campus beautification and afforestation. So far, the University has completed the construction of multiple humanistic sceneries and cultural facilities, such as the round-island man-made lake, the artificial river, the central scenic avenue, the college student art plaza, and other theme botanical gardens. A highly ecological, garden-like, digital, and humanized modern campus and a most favorable physical environment for studying and living have been established.

In its long history of teaching practice, the University has formed its education concept of “Cultivating Talents, Exploring Truth,” the university motto of “Integrity, Learning, Commitment, and Perfection,” the university spirit of “Selfless Dedication, Pursuit of Excellence,” and the study style of “Practice Learning and Integrity Equally, Never Tired of Knowing.”

University Motto 

SDUT Motto： Integrity, Learned, Commitment, Excellence

As for the four phrases applied in the university motto, “Integrity” highlights the educational concept that the cultivation of character is given the first priority; “Learned” is the goal for students to achieve in their study; “Commitment” stresses the importance of practice and the unity of knowledge and practice; “Excellence” embodies the perfect realm where character and knowledge can integrate harmoniously and the highest ideal that education can accomplish.

External links
Shandong University of Technology Official Website 
Shandong University of Technology Official Website 
Shandong University of Technology edurank.org 
Shandong University of Technology 4icu.org 
Shandong University of Technology usnews 
SDUT Programme List 

Universities and colleges in Shandong
Technical universities and colleges in China